is a railway station in Urayasu, Chiba, Japan, operated by East Japan Railway Company (JR East). It is most well known for being the main railway access point for the Tokyo Disney Resort.

Lines

Station layout

The station has a Midori no Madoguchi staffed ticket office. The station consists of a single elevated platform serving two tracks.

Platforms

Disney Resort Line
Resort Gateway Station of the Disney Resort Line is a short walk away outside the station.

History
The station opened on 1 December 1988.

Station numbering was introduced in 2016 with Maihama being assigned station number JE07.

The platforms were extended by a total of about 90 meters in January 2021 with work starting in April 2020. The platform extension will open for service on 29 January 2022. In the new configuration, trains will be stopping towards the back of the platform relative to their direction.

Passenger statistics
In fiscal 2013, the station was used by an average of 76,495 passengers daily (boarding passengers only), making it the 58th-busiest station operated by JR East. The daily average passenger figures (boarding passengers only) in previous years are as shown below.

Bus routes
There is a bus terminal in front of the station.

Tokyo Disneyland Bus Terminal
It takes about 5 minutes from Maihama Station to the bus terminal.
 
The terminal which are named Bus Terminal East and Bus Terminal West. Bus Terminal East is located near the entrance of Tokyo Disneyland and Maihama Station, and is chiefly used by bus companies of Keisei Group, which are Keisei Bus and Tokyo Bay City Bus and Keisei Transit Bus, is passed through by bus routes which are bound for vicinities, highway buses and airport buses which are bound for Haneda Airport and Narita Airport in additional to shuttle buses which are bound for Tokyo Disney resort partner hotels operated by Daishinto and Keisei Transit Bus. Besides, Bus Terminal WEST' is located west of main entrance. And, the terminal's arrivals and departures are shuttle buses which are bound for Tokyo Disney resort good neighbor hotels and night buses which are bound for distant places and reservation buses.

No.26~28
Resevation Buses
The bus routes run when busy season and people reserve.

Surrounding area
The station is the main access point of Tokyo Disney Resort. The park gate of Tokyo Disneyland is located a short walk from the station while the Resort Gateway Station of the Disney Resort Line monorail line and the Ikspiari shopping complex are located directly beside the Maihama station gates.

See also
List of railway stations in Japan
Rail transport in Walt Disney Parks and Resorts

References

External links

 Maihama Station 

Railway stations in Chiba Prefecture
Urayasu, Chiba
Railway stations in Japan opened in 1988
Stations of East Japan Railway Company